Corallus, the neotropical tree boas, are a genus of boas found in Central America, South America and the West Indies. Nine extant species are recognized .

Description
All members of this genus are long, slightly flattened laterally and have thin bodies with large heads. They typically have relatively large eyes, although this is less pronounced in the larger species, such as the emerald tree boa, Corallus caninus.  The anterior teeth are highly elongated, often being several times the length one would expect for snakes of their size. These are used for penetrating layers of feathers to get a firm grip on birds, their primary prey. All members of the genus are nocturnal and have large numbers of very pronounced thermoreceptive pits are located between the labial scales.

Distribution and habitat
Species in the genus Corallus are found in Central America, South America and the West Indies. In Central America they occur in Honduras, eastern Guatemala through Nicaragua, Costa Rica and Panama. The range of the genus in South America includes Pacific Colombia and Ecuador, as well as the Amazon Basin from Colombia, Ecuador, Peru and northern Bolivia through Brazil to Venezuela, Isla Margarita, Trinidad, Tobago, Guyana, Suriname and French Guiana. In the West Indies it is found on St. Vincent, the Grenadines (Bequia Island, Ile Quatre, Baliceaux, Mustique, Canouan, Maryeau, Union Island, Petit Martinique and Carriacou), Grenada and the Windward Islands (Lesser Antilles).

Species
, nine species are recognized in this genus. C. annulatus was formerly treated as a subspecies of C. annulatus but is now treated as a species in its own right.

) Not including the nominate subspecies.
T) Type species.

Captivity

Two species of Corallus are frequently imported as pets, the Amazon tree boa, C. hortulanus, and the emerald tree boa, C. caninus. Most, if not all, have an aggressive demeanor and will strike readily. Their stunning coloration makes them popular, but their specialized habitat and feeding make them suitable only for advanced keepers. Captive bred specimens are much more docile than their wild caught counterparts.

Extinct species
A fossil species, Corallus priscus, was described in Brazil in 2001.

References

External links

Corallus.com. Accessed 4 July 2008.

 
Extant Paleocene first appearances
Snake genera
Taxa named by François Marie Daudin